The Treaty of Aranjuez was signed on December 25, 1780, between Spain and Morocco. Based on the terms of the treaty, Morocco recognized Spanish rule over Melilla. The treaty defused tensions, lessening the chance that Morocco would agree to British requests to declare war on the Spanish, as in 1774.

See also
List of treaties

Aranjuez (1780)
1780 treaties
1780 in Spain
History of Melilla
Aranjuez (1780)
Aranjuez

References